The Baly Medal is a biennial award awarded by the Royal College of Physicians of London.

Founded by a gift from Frederick Daniel Dyster (1809?–93) received in 1866, confirmed by deed 1930 – in memory of William Baly: £400 to provide a gold medal for the person deemed to have most distinguished himself in the science of physiology, especially during the previous two years. The award is made every alternate year on the recommendation of the President and Council at the Quarterly Meeting in July and presented on the occasion of the Harveian Oration.

Medallists
Source 1871-1911 RCP
 1869: Richard Owen
 1871: Lionel Smith Beale 
 1873: William Sharpey
 1875: Claude Bernard
 1877: Carl Ludwig
 1879: Charles Darwin
 1881: John Scott Burdon-Sanderson
 1883: Charles-Édouard Brown-Séquard
 1885: William Kitchen Parker
 1887: David Ferrier
 1889: Rudolf Heidenhain
 1891: Michael Foster
 1893: Moritz Schiff
 1895: Walter Holbrook Gaskell
 1897: Edward Albert Sharpey-Schafer
 1899: Charles Scott Sherrington
 1901: Frederick William Pavy
 1903: John Newport Langley
 1905: Ivan Pavlov
 1907: Ernest Henry Starling
 1909: Emil Fischer
 1911: William Dobinson Halliburton
 1913: John Burdon Sanderson Haldane
 1915: Frederick Gowland Hopkins
 1917: William Maddock Bayliss
 1919: Leonard Hill
 1921: Henry Dale
 1923: Joseph Barcroft
 1925: 
 1927: Archibald Vivian Hill
 1929: Edgar Douglas Adrian
 1931: Walter Bradford Cannon
 1933: Robert Robison
 1935: Francis Marshall
 1937: Ernest Kennaway
 1939: Charles Herbert Best
 1941: Edgar Allen
 1943: Frederic Bartlett
 1945: August Krogh
 1947: Bernardo Alberto Houssay
 1949: Edward Mellanby
 1951: George de Hevesy
 1953: Karl Lashley
 1955: Alan Hodgkin
 1957: Ernest Basil Verney
 1959: Ivan de Burgh Daly
 1961: John Eccles
 1963: Wilhelm Siegmund Feldberg
 1965: Roderic Alfred Gregory
 1967: Bernard Katz
 1969: George Wingfield Harris
 1971: Dorothy Hodgkin
 1973: Eric William Horton
 1975: Andrew Huxley
 1977: John Vane
 1979: Hans Kosterlitz
 1981: Malcolm Davenport Milne
 1983: William Paton
 1985: Paul Polani
 1987: Aaron Klug
 1989: Michael Berridge
 1991: David Marsden
 1993: Denis Noble
 1995: Charles Nicholas Hales
 1997: Alec Jeffreys
 1999: Paul Nurse
 2001: Colin Blakemore
 2003: John Sulston
 2005: Gregory Winter
 2007: Sydney Brenner
 2009: Martin Evans
 2011: Peter Ratcliffe
 2013: Stephen O'Rahilly
 2015: 
 2017: Dimitri Kullmann
 2019:
 2022:

See also

 List of medicine awards
 Prizes named after people

References

Medicine awards
British awards
Awards established in 1869
1869 establishments in the United Kingdom
Royal College of Physicians